USS D-1 (SS-17) was the lead ship of the D-class submarines of the United States Navy. Her keel was laid down by Fore River Shipbuilding Company in Quincy, Massachusetts, under a subcontract from Electric Boat Company of Groton, Connecticut, as Narwhal, making her the first ship of the United States Navy to be named for the narwhal, a gray and white arctic whale which averages 20 feet in length, the male of which has a long, twisted ivory tusk of commercial value.  Narwhal was launched on 8 April 1909 sponsored by Mrs. Gregory C. Davison, and commissioned on 23 November 1909.

Service history
Narwhal joined the Atlantic Torpedo Fleet, based at Newport, Rhode Island. These pioneer submarines operated very actively in diving grounds in Cape Cod and Narragansett Bay, Long Island Sound and Block Island Sound, and Chesapeake Bay, and off Norfolk, Virginia; on target ranges proving torpedoes; experimental operations; and cruises along the East Coast. Narwhal was renamed D-1 on 17 November 1911.

From 20 January – 11 April 1913, the submarine flotilla cruised to the Caribbean Sea, and from 5 January – 21 April 1914 visited Gulf of Mexico and Florida ports.

During World War I, D-1 trained crews and classes of officers and served in experiments in the Third Naval District. After overhaul, D-1 was placed in reserve commission on 9 September 1919, continuing her work of training new submariners along with experimental and development work.

On 15 July 1921, she was placed in commission, in ordinary. She was towed to Philadelphia Navy Yard arriving on 30 January 1922. Decommissioned on 8 February, her hulk was sold on 5 June.

Whale encounter
The New York World quoted Lt. Chester Nimitz, in command of Narwhal in August 1911, with regards to an encounter with whales that the submarine had. This encounter is not referenced anywhere else and may be journalistic hyperbole.

References

External links

United States D-class submarines
World War I submarines of the United States
Ships built in Quincy, Massachusetts
1909 ships